Dumb insolence is an offence against military discipline in which a subordinate displays an attitude of defiance towards a superior without open disagreement.  It is also found in settings such as education in which obedience and deference to a teacher is expected but may be refused by unruly pupils.  For example, a pupil may suck their teeth, sigh or walk away while being spoken to.

See also
Malicious compliance
Passive aggression
Stonewalling
The Good Soldier Švejk

References

Military life